Brett Ormsby (born 1 December 1982) is an American water polo player. He was a member of the United States Men's National Water Polo Team, playing as a driver. He was a part of the  team at the 2004 Summer Olympics. He played for the UCLA Bruins in United States.

Ormsby married water polo player Thalia Munro who participated for the United States women's national water polo team at the 2004 Summer Olympics.

References

External links
 

1982 births
Living people
American male water polo players
Water polo players at the 2004 Summer Olympics
Olympic water polo players of the United States
American water polo coaches
People from San Diego